Advaldo de Oliveira Silva (born June 15, 1986), or simply Advaldo, is a Brazilian winger who last played for São José. He was a championship manager 03/04 superstar. unfortunately he was unable to replicate this form in real life

Honours
 Rio de Janeiro State League: 2007

Contract
 Avaí (Loan) June 5, 2007, to December 14, 2007
 Vitória May 10, 2006, to December 14, 2007

External links

 
 CBF 
 Advaldo at ZeroZero

1986 births
Avaí FC players
Brazilian footballers
CR Flamengo footballers
Esporte Clube Vitória players
Campinense Clube players
Living people
Associação Desportiva São Caetano players
Association football forwards